Infama is an Argentine TV talk show, hosted by Santiago del Moro. Del moro won the 2013 Tato award as TV host for his work in it.

Staff

Season 1 (2008)
Hostess:Santiago del Moro and Alejandra Maglietti
Panelists:Alejandra Canosa, Silvina Fuentes and Sebastián Tempone
Chroniclers:Silvia Fuentes

Season 2 (2009)
Hostess:Santiago del Moro
Panelists:Alejandra Maglietti, Magalí Montoro, Valeria Schapira, Adriana Schettini, Paula Varela, Soledad Villareal and Sebastián Tempone
Chroniclers:Silvina Fuentes, Sebastián Tempone and Pía Shaw

Season 3 (2010)
Hostess:Santiago del Moro
Panelists:Marina Calabró, Adriana Schettini, Paula Varela, Soledad Villareal and Ivana Palliotti
Chroniclers:Sebastián Tempone and Pía Shaw

Season 4 (2011)
Hostess:Santiago del Moro
Panelists:Marcela Feudale, Marina Calabró y Soledad Villareal
Chroniclers:Sebastián Tempone

Season 5 (2012)
Hostess:Santiago del Moro
Panelists:Marcela Feudale and Marina Calabró
Chroniclers:Sebastián Tempone

Season 6 (2013)
Hostess:Santiago del Moro
Panelists:Marcela Feudale, Marina Calabró and Mariana Brey
Chroniclers:Sebastián Tempone

Season 7 (2014)
Hostess:Santiago del Moro
Panelists:Marcela Feudale, Marina Calabró and Andrea Taboada
Chroniclers:Sebastián Tempone

Season 8 (2015)
Hostess:Rodrigo Lussich
Panelists:Marcela Feudale, Cora Debarbieri, Noelia Marzol, Daniela Katz, Débora Damato, Lili Monsegou and Carla Conte.
Chroniclers:Sebastián Tempone and Alejandro Guatti

Season 9 (2016)
Hostess:Rodrigo Lussich (Abandonment), Pía Shaw and Denise Dumas
Panelists:Luis Ventura, Cora Debarbieri, Carla Conte (Abandonment), David Kavlin, Rafael Juli y Nicolas Peralta
Chroniclers:Sebastián Tempone and Alejandro Guatti
Executive producers : Fernanda Merdeni - Julio Chao

Season 10 (2017)
Hostess:Pía Shaw and Denise Dumas
Panelists:Luis Ventura, Cora Debarbieri, David Kavlin, Sofía Macaggi, Guido Záffora y Guillermo Pardini.
Chroniclers:Sebastián Tempone, Alejandro Guatti and Nicolas Peralta
Executive producers : Fernanda Merdeni - Julio Chao

Awards

Nominations
 2013 Martín Fierro Awards
 Best male TV host (Santiago del Moro)

References

Argentine television talk shows
América TV original programming
2008 Argentine television series debuts